The Winery Dogs is the debut album by the American hard rock supergroup of the same name, released in Japan on May 5, 2013, and worldwide on July 23.

Reception

Critical
The album received positive reviews from critics. AllMusic reviewer James Christopher Monger compared the album to blues rock bands such as Cream and Led Zeppelin and modern hard rock bands like Soundgarden, Black Stone Cherry and Velvet Revolver. He called the album "hard-hitting, fun, yet meticulously crafted 21st century rock that manages to celebrate the past and kick open new doors."

Commercial

Released on July 23, 2013, it sold 10,200 copies in the United States in its first week, and reached No. 27 on the Billboard 200 albums chart. It also debuted at  No. 5 on Billboard's Top Rock Albums, No. 3 on Alternative Albums, and No. 4 on Independent Albums. The album has sold 58,000 copies in the United States as of September 2015.

Track listing

All tracks written by The Winery Dogs.

On the Japanese edition of the album, the track "Criminal" replaced "Time Machine" on the track listing. The order in which the songs are listed remains the same.

Personnel
Richie Kotzen – lead vocals, guitars, keyboards
Billy Sheehan – bass, vocals
Mike Portnoy – drums, percussion, vocals

References

2013 debut albums
The Winery Dogs albums